= Odette Lamolle =

French translator (1910–2000)

Odette Lamolle (17 July 1910 – 20 April 2000) was a French translator, known for her translations of Joseph Conrad.

Her father was a Bordeaux businessman and her mother was a concert pianist. At a very young age, Lamolle was attracted by Joseph Conrad. She learnt English from an English governess initially to teach her elder sister, and also want to be an English teacher. In order to be qualified, she had to spend time in Britain. However, her family refused. As the result, she stayed at home, married, produced a daughter. Due to the broke out of the World War Two, the foreign residence requirement for English language teachers was relaxed, so she finally got qualified. After taught in Bordeaux for 18 months, she realized that she was not suited for the job, and went on to help with the family business. In 1980, after the retirement, she began to systematically translate Joseph Conrad's works into French for pleasure. In 1995, a Paris publishing house, Editions Autrement, accidentally knew the existing of her translations and was surprised by its high quality, agreed to publish all of them.
